Gunner Trey Kiel (born July 23, 1993) is a former American football quarterback. He played college football for the Notre Dame Fighting Irish and later for the Cincinnati Bearcats.

Early years
Kiel attended Columbus East High School in Columbus, Indiana. He played on the Columbus East football team. As a senior in 2011, he won the Indiana Mr. Football Award.

Kiel was considered the best quarterback recruit in the nation by the Rivals.com and Scout.com recruiting networks.

College career
Kiel originally committed to Indiana University, before decommitting and committing to Louisiana State University. He then decommitted and officially enrolled at the University of Notre Dame on January 17, 2012.

After spending the 2012 season on the depth chart behind Everett Golson, Tommy Rees, and Andrew Hendrix, Kiel announced his decision to transfer from Notre Dame.

On April 10, 2013, Kiel announced he would transfer to the University of Cincinnati for the 2013 season. After sitting out the 2013 season as required by NCAA transfer rules, Kiel made his college debut on September 12, 2014, against the Toledo Rockets. He threw six touchdown passes in that game, the most by an FBS quarterback in a first game. Kiel finished the season with 3,254 passing yards, second most in the American Athletic Conference. His 31 touchdown passes led the conference and tied the school record. Kiel was 18 yards short of tying the Cincinnati school record for single season passing yards when he exited the Military Bowl in the third quarter with a head injury.

Kiel began the 2015 season as Cincinnati's starter. He was plagued with injuries throughout the year, being replaced by backup Hayden Moore on several occasions. Kiel missed two games after being hospitalized with a head injury in Cincinnati's game against Memphis. He did not travel with the team to their bowl game in Hawaii, citing personal problems.

Prior to the 2016 season, Cincinnati head coach, Tommy Tuberville, announced that Kiel, now a fifth-year senior, would be the third-string quarterback behind sophomore Hayden Moore (starter) and redshirt freshman Ross Trail (second-string). On October 20, Kiel was named the starter for Cincinnati's homecoming game against East Carolina after Hayden Moore went down with injury. He started the next three games but was benched again when Moore returned from injury.

Statistics

Personal life
Gunner's uncle, Blair Kiel (1961–2012), was a quarterback at Notre Dame and played in the National Football League, His brother Drew Kiel was QB for Illinois State and brother Dusty Kiel, was a QB for Indiana University.

References

External links
Cincinnati Bearcats bio
Notre Dame Fighting Irish bio

1993 births
Living people
American football quarterbacks
Notre Dame Fighting Irish football players
Cincinnati Bearcats football players
People from Columbus, Indiana
Players of American football from Indiana